In the late hours of 3 February and the early hours of 4 February 1973, six men, all of whom were Catholics, were shot and killed in the New Lodge area of north Belfast:

 four (one IRA member and three civilians) of them were shot dead at the junction at Edlingham Street by British Army snipers, 
 the other two men were shot dead by the Ulster Defence Association (UDA), one IRA member and one Italian citizen, the owner of a local café.
Three other men were shot dead on 4 February by what was believed to be Loyalist paramilitaries, to take the total death toll to nine on the 3-4 February. The six men killed in the New Lodge area became known as "The New Lodge Six".

There have been allegations over the years that collusion took place between the British security forces and paramilitaries at the time.  Northern Ireland's Attorney General in 2018 urged an investigation into the deaths of the New Lodge Six.  The Director of Public Prosecutions decided not to ask the PSNI to carry out an investigation, and relatives in 2020 launched a legal action in response.

Background
The Troubles broke out in August 1969 with severe rioting in Belfast and the British army was called in to restore order. Shortly after, the newly formed guerrilla movement the Provisional IRA waged a campaign against the British of shooting and bombing. In response, Loyalist paramilitary groups such as the Ulster Volunteer Force and (UDA) waged a campaign of killings against the Nationalist community in Northern Ireland and also bombed targets in the Republic of Ireland. 
The conflict was a bloody and bitter one with all sides carrying out massacres of civilians. The incidents included McGurk's Bar bombing, which killed 15 civilians, was carried out by the UVF, Bloody Sunday, in which the British army shot dead 14 Catholic civilians and Bloody Friday, which killed 9 people (2 British soldiers, 1 UDA member and 6 Civilians) was carried out by the IRA.

The New Lodge, on the edge of the city centre, with a history of active Irish republicanism and surrounded by Loyalist areas, saw much violence during The Troubles. Most of the remaining Protestant population left under intimidation in the early 1970s, to be replaced by Catholics intimidated from Loyalist areas of Belfast. As a stronghold of the Third Battalion of the Provisional IRA's Belfast Brigade, rioting and gun battles between the IRA and the British Army and loyalist paramilitaries were almost daily occurrences during the early 1970s and other periods of high political tension such as the 1981 Irish Hunger Strike, and occurred sporadically during the rest of that period.  The area was vulnerable to attacks by Loyalist paramilitaries throughout The Troubles, particularly to drive-by shootings.

Shootings
In the first four days of February 1973, fourteen people died and many more were injured in numerous gun attacks across the city. On Friday 2 February, the hooded body of 28-year-old Catholic, Patrick Bradley from Andersonstown, was found in a car in Maurice Street. An 18-year-old petrol pump attendant was shot dead in his café on York Road. Earlier in the day, ten people from the Beechmount area were injured when gunmen opened fire from a passing car. Undercover British army involvement was suspected in the Beechmount shooting. In Ardoyne, in a similar attack, residents escaped injury.

Tension was high in Belfast on Saturday 3 February. The UDA had paraded from many parts of the city to the Laddas Drive RUC station to demand the release of two of its members who had recently been interned. This was the first time Loyalists were threatened with internment and there were many protests and rioting by Loyalists in Belfast because of it.

The first shooting in the New Lodge area occurred at around 11.00pm when members of the UDA shot dead James Sloan (19) and James McCann (18), both IRA Volunteers, while they stood outside Lynch's Bar, in a drive-by shooting. The car drove down the Antrim Road and fire was directed at a Chinese restaurant injuring others.

After the initial attack, residents gathered on the streets after hearing the shooting, they soon came under a hail of gunfire from several positions. British Army soldiers fired a number of rounds at a crowd of people from Duncairn Gardens down Edlingham Street and from the top of Templar and Alamein Flats. For the first time in Northern Ireland the army were using their new 'Nitesights'. Four more people, Tony Campbell (19), Ambrose Hardy (26), Brendan Maguire (33) and John Loughran (35) were shot dead by British snipers.

Aftermath
The British Army released a statement after the shootings in which they claimed that between 23.45 and 03.00 there was a severe gun battle in the New Lodge area. In about 30 separate incidents, nearly 200 shots were fired at the security forces and fire was returned on most occasions. They said that seven of the people shot were gunmen and six of them died, eyewitness claims dispute these statements claiming none of those shot was armed at the time they were killed.

The sister of Ambrose Hardy claims he was waving a white petticoat when he was killed.
Six years later Ambrose Hardy's brother John Hardy (43) was killed by UVF gunmen while he was having dinner with his six children.

References

External links
 CAIN – University of Ulster Conflict Archive

Conflicts in 1973
1973 in Northern Ireland
History of Belfast
Massacres in Northern Ireland
Massacres committed by the United Kingdom
British Army in Operation Banner
Military scandals
Mass murder in 1973
Deaths by firearm in Northern Ireland
Military actions and engagements during the Troubles (Northern Ireland)
Terrorist incidents in the United Kingdom in 1973
1970s murders in Northern Ireland
1973 crimes in Ireland
The Troubles in Belfast
Terrorism deaths in Northern Ireland
Terrorism committed by the United Kingdom
Ulster Defence Association actions
February 1973 events in the United Kingdom
Terrorist incidents in Northern Ireland
Mass shootings in Northern Ireland